Bygdin is a lake in Vang Municipality in Innlandet county, Norway. The  is located in the southern part of the Jotunheimen mountain range.

The depth of Bygdin is regulated for hydroelectric power generation at nearby power plants. The Vinsteråni river runs out Bygdin, passes through the Vinstre and Vinstervatna lakes and into the river Vinstra. That river later flows into the Gudbrandsdalslågen river.

Some of the notable mountains located along the shores of the lake include Galdeberget, Torfinnstindene, and Nørdre Kalvehølotinden. Along the lake there are many tourist huts. On the west end lies Eidsbugarden, on the north side lies the cabins at Torfinnsbu and on the east side lies the mountain hotel  Bygdin Høyfjellshotell. In the summer, these huts are connected by boat and in winter by ski or snowmobile. 

A memorial was raised in 1909 to the Norwegian poet Aasmund Olavsson Vinje (1818-1870) at the western end of Bygdin at Eidsbugarden on the outskirts of Jotunheim National Park where he had a private hut. Friends and followers commemorated his contribution to appreciation of Norwegian nature and strengthening of the Norwegian national identity. Today, Eidsbugarden is a rather large mountain tourist centre, with a hotel from 1909 which is being restored to reopen in the summer 2007, a Norwegian Mountain Touring Association (DNT) cabin and approximately 160 private huts.

Transportation
 is a vessel that has operated on Bygdin every summer since 1912. The boat was built at Glommen Mechanical Works in Fredrikstad, Norway, and assembled at Bygdin. The route between Bygdin and Eidsbugarden has two departures daily, and there is capacity for 98 passengers on the boat trip.

See also
List of lakes in Norway

References

External links
Bygdin Høifieldshotel  website

Lakes of Innlandet
Jotunheimen
Vang, Innlandet
Tourist attractions in Innlandet